This is an alphabetically sorted list of writers in the Catalan language:

A 
 Elisabet Abeyà
 Joan Alcover
 Gabriel Alomar
 Núria Añó
 Sebastià Juan Arbó

B 
 Borja Bagunyà
 Eva Baltasar
 Prudenci Bertrana
 Joan Binimelis
 Edmond Brazes
 Joan Brossa

C 
 Jaume Cabré
 Maria Teresa Cabré
 Pere Calders
 Mercè Canela
 Josep Carner
 Maite Carranza
 Jordi Casanovas
 Víctor Català
 Jaume Cuadrat
 Toni Cucarella

D 
 Bernat Desclot
 Teresa Duran

E 
 Francesc Eiximenis
 Salvador Espriu
 Vicent Andrés Estellés

F 
Ester Fenoll Garcia
Gabriel Ferrater
 Josep Vicenç Foix
 Francesc Fontanella
 Joan Fuster

G 
 Martí Joan de Galba
 Jordi Galceran
 Tomàs Garcés
 Gaziel
 Juan Goytisolo
 Adrià Gual
 Àngel Guimerà
 Francesc Vicent Garcia

I

J 
 Maria de la Pau Janer

L 
 Ramon Llull

M 
 Jordi de Manuel
 Joan Maragall
 Ausiàs March
 Joan Margarit
 Miquel Martí i Pol
 Joanot Martorell
 Bernat Metge
 Gabriel Mòger
 Terenci Moix
 Jesús Moncada
 Quim Monzó
 Josep Ferrater i Mora
 Ramon Muntaner

O 
 Joan Oliver
 Maria Antònia Oliver Cabrer
 Narcís Oller
 Eugeni d'Ors

P 
 Sergi Pàmies
 Manuel de Pedrolo
 Albert Sánchez Piñol
 Josep Pla
 Baltasar Porcel i Pujol
 Núria Pradas 
 Gilabert de Próixita
 Frederic Pujulà i Vallés

Q 
 Pere Quart

R 
 Carles Riba
 Mercè Rodoreda
 Montserrat Roig
 Josep Romaguera
 Bartomeu Rosselló-Pòrcel
 Santiago Rusiñol

S 
 Joan Salvat-Papasseit
 Joan Sales
 Cèlia Sànchez-Mústich
 Isabel-Clara Simó
 Sílvia Soler

 Jaume Subirana

T 
 Ramon Bech Taberner
 Màrius Torres
 Anselm Turmeda

V 
 Jacint Verdaguer
 Arnau de Vilanova

Z 
 Lydia Zimmermann

See also
 Catalan literature
 List of Catalan-language poets

References 

 
Catalan